Esmee Michelle Visser (born 26 January 1996) is a Dutch speed skater and Olympic Champion, who specialises in long distances.

Born in Leiden, she qualified for the 5000 metres at the 2018 Winter Olympics in December 2017. At the 2018 European Championships, she won the 3000 metres in her second-ever international race. On 16 February 2018, she won the gold medal in the women's 5000 metres at the 2018 Winter Olympics with a time of 6:50.23.

At the first competition weekend of the 2018–19 ISU World Cup in Obihiro, Japan, she won the 3000m event, the first World Cup victory of her career.

Personal records

At the end of the 2019–20 speed skating season, Visser occupied the 43rd position on the adelskalender with a points total of 160.226
 
Source:

Tournament overview

Source:
 DNQ : Did not qualify for the 5000m distance
 DNP : Did not participate
 GWC : Grand World Cup
 NC : No classification

World Cup overview

Source:

 (b) = Division B
– = Did not participate

Medals won

References

External links

 
 
 Eurosport profile
 iSkate profile

Living people
1996 births
Speed skaters at the 2018 Winter Olympics
Dutch female speed skaters
Olympic speed skaters of the Netherlands
Sportspeople from Leiden
Medalists at the 2018 Winter Olympics
Olympic medalists in speed skating
Olympic gold medalists for the Netherlands
20th-century Dutch women
21st-century Dutch women